Klausewitzia ritae is a species of South American darter (family Crenuchidae) found in the upper Amazon River basin at the Peruvian/Brazilian border.  It is the only member of its genus.

The fish is named in honor of Rita Klausewitz (d. 1995), the wife of ichthyologist Wolfgang Klausewitz.

References
 

Crenuchidae
Fish of the Amazon basin
Fish of Bolivia
Freshwater fish of Brazil
Taxa named by Jacques Géry

Fish described in 1965